The Majorca Building is a neo-Romanesque, eight-storey tall building in Melbourne, Australia, designed and constructed between 1928 and 1930. Located at 258-260 Flinders Lane, it was designed by Harry Norris, one of the most prolific architects in the city during the 1920s and '30s.

Norris's designs incorporated both emerging Australian and American architectural styles and the Majorca Building has been described as his best work incorporating faience.

History 
The Majorca Building was built on a site at the end of the intersection of Flinders Lane and Degraves Street. Flinders Lane was in the heart of the rag trade in Melbourne and acted as a beacon for the area. During the 1920s, property values rose as ground floors were increasingly given over to tailoring/clothing stores and upper floors to soft-goods merchants. The Majorca Building was originally designed as office space.

Design 
Architect Harry Norris incorporated many American styles into his work. He was inspired by the then popular Spanish Colonial Revival style after visits to the United States. The building is laden with Spanish/Moorish features, including blue faience tiles; foliated (leaf shaped) and rope moulded ornament, painted in gold and a foyer featuring terrazzo and inlaid stone. A Heritage Victoria database entry for Majorca House, says: "The Moorish influence in its terracotta façade places it firmly within the Melbourne tradition of exotic architecture in the late 1920s."

The Majorca Building is a natural progression from Norris's other celebrated building in this style, the Kellow Houses (Former Kellow Falkiner Showrooms) on St Kilda Road, South Yarra, a car showroom completed in 1928.

Current usage 
A retail store is located on the ground floor. The remainder of the building is privately owned residential apartments.

Gallery

See also
 Alkira House
 Architecture of Melbourne

References 

Buildings and structures in Melbourne City Centre
Art Deco architecture in Melbourne
Heritage-listed buildings in Melbourne
Commercial buildings completed in 1930
1930 establishments in Australia